Phyllostachys sulphurea  is a species of bamboo found in Anhui, Fujian, Henan, Hunan, Jiangsu, Jiangxi, Shaanxi, Shandong, Zhejiang provinces of China

References

External links
 
 

sulphurea
Flora of China
Taxa named by Élie-Abel Carrière